Milabena is a rural locality in the local government areas of Waratah-Wynyard and Circular Head in the North West region of Tasmania. First settled in the late 19th century it has been a centre for forestry, mixed agriculture especially potato growing and grazing dairy cattle. The 2016 census determined a population of 89 for the state suburb of Milabena.

History
The locality was originally known as Tuckers Hill. The name Milabena was in use by 1921, and was gazetted in 1966. Milabena Post Office opened on 1 June 1920 and closed in 1934.

Geography
The ridge line of the Dip Range forms the western boundary. The Detention Falls, a cascade waterfall on the Detention River, is located in Milabena.

Road infrastructure
The C229 route (Myalla Road) enters from the north-east and runs through to the south before exiting. Route C230 (Lapoinya Road) starts at an intersection with route C229 and runs south-east and north-east before exiting.

References

Localities of Waratah–Wynyard Council
Localities of Circular Head Council
Towns in Tasmania